The 2nd Frigate Squadron was an administrative unit of the Royal Navy from 1947 to 2002.

Operational history
During its existence, the squadron included Black Swan-class, Type 15, Type 16, Leander-class and Type 22 frigates. The squadron was based at HMNB Devonport.

Silver Jubilee 1977
At the Silver Jubilee Fleet Review, 24–29 June 1977, 2nd Frigate Squadron comprised:
  – Capt G. M. F. Vallings, RN (Captain Second Frigate Squadron)
  – Lt Cdr M. J. Larmuth, RN
  – Lt Cdr M. H. Rhodes, RN
  – Lt Cdr W. J. Christie, RN

Disbandment 2002
The squadron was disbanded in March 2002 under the Royal Navy's "Fleet First" reorganization.

Squadron commander

References

See also
 List of squadrons and flotillas of the Royal Navy

Frigate squadrons of the Royal Navy